Duane Glinton (born 16 March 1982) is a retired Turks & Caicos Islands football midfielder. He currently works as a coach alongside his brother Gavin at Impact Soccer Club in Brentwood.

Club career
Having graduated from Bradley University he played for Premier Development League outfit Ogden Outlaws in the 2006 season.

International career
Glinton made his debut for the Turks & Caicos Islands in a February 2004 World Cup qualification match against Haiti. He also played in the return match and in two 2008 World Cup qualification games. As of July 2011, he had earned 9 caps, a national record, since broken by Philip Shearer.

Personal life
Duane is the younger brother of former Charleston Battery and San Jose Earthquakes striker Gavin Glinton.

References

External links
 
 Bradley profile

1982 births
Living people
People from Livermore, California
Turks and Caicos Islands people of American descent
American people of Turks and Caicos Islands descent
Association football midfielders
Turks and Caicos Islands footballers
Turks and Caicos Islands international footballers
Bradley Braves men's soccer players
Ogden Outlaws players
Turks and Caicos Islands expatriate footballers
Expatriate soccer players in the United States
Turks and Caicos Islands expatriate sportspeople in the United States
USL League Two players